Elections to Eastleigh Council were held on 4 May 2010.  One third of the council was up for election and the Liberal Democrat party kept overall control of the council.

After the election, the composition of the council was
Liberal Democrat 39
Conservative 4
Labour 1

Election result

Ward results

External links
 

2010
2010 English local elections
May 2010 events in the United Kingdom
2010s in Hampshire